is a town in Wittenberg district in Saxony-Anhalt, Germany.

Geography
The town was the seat of the offices of the administrative community (Verwaltungsgemeinschaft) of Tor zur Dübener Heide until it was disbanded in January 2011. It lies about 25 km southwest of Lutherstadt Wittenberg, southeast of Dessau and northeast of Bitterfeld on the edge of the Düben Heath.

Nearby lies the Gremminer See, a lake created as a result of the redevelopment of the former brown coal strip mine of Golpa-Nord, and on whose shore is found the Ferropolis ("Iron Town") industrial memorial, actually a museum dedicated to "industrial culture".

The town Gräfenhainichen consists of the following Ortschaften or municipal divisions:
Gräfenhainichen
Jüdenberg
Möhlau
Schköna
Tornau
Zschornewitz

History
Gräfenhainichen had its first documentary mention in 1254. In 1454, Gräfenhainichen had its town rights reconfirmed after the old documents by which these were granted had been destroyed in a fire. In 1637, during the Thirty Years' War, the town was almost utterly destroyed by the Swedes. The year 1859 saw the dedication of the new railway line between Wittenberg and Bitterfeld. The town's advantageous location allowed industry to move into town. The first printing shop was set up in 1874; until 1990, there were still as many as four printing shops in Gräfenhainichen. By 1890, brown coal was being mined in Gräfenhainichen, first underground, and then in strip mines. In 1954, at which time the town was in East Germany, Gräfenhainichen became a district seat (Kreisstadt) for three towns and 27 communities. This lasted until 1994, four years after Reunification.

Coat of arms
The town's current civic arms were granted on 17 December 1993. The town's oldest known seal dates from 1477, and the current arms are based on this. The tower stands for the old fortified city and the inescutcheon with the lion rampant, being Meißen's arms, recalls that in 1377 the Counts of Meißen became the local overlords. Until 1993, Gräfenhainichen's coat of arms was of a similar design, but with the heraldic elements arranged slightly differently, and with different colours. The old arms were predominantly red.

Mayors 
2001-2015: Harry Rüßbült (The Left) 
Since 2015: Enrico Schilling (CDU).

Town partnerships
Gräfenhainichen maintains partnerships with the following towns:
  Laubach, Hesse, since 1992
  Élancourt, France, since 2003
  Zoersel, Belgium, since August 2005

Transportation
Gräfenhainichen lies on the Bundesstraße federal highway, B 107, running from Bad Düben to Coswig, on the B 100 from Wittenberg to Bitterfeld, and on the Landesstraße (state road) L136 to Zschornewitz.

The Dessau-Ost interchange with the A9 autobahn (Munich - Berlin) is about 17 km away.

Gräfenhainichen's railway station lies on the Deutsche Bahn line between Wittenberg and Bitterfeld.

Personalities

Joachim Gottlob Am Ende, theologian and teacher
Paul Gerhardt, (1607-1676), theologian and hymn writer
Johann Gottfried Galle, (1812-1910), astronomer
Hugo Winckler, (1863-1913), archaeologist and linguist
 Wilhelm Ohnesorge (1872-1962), politician (NSDAP), Reichspostminister (minister for mail)

Clubs
 Anglerverein Gräfenhainichen e.V. von 1959 (angling club)
 dashrecords e.V.
 Deutscher Amateur-Radio-Club e.V.
 Ferropolis Bergbau- u. Erlebnisbahn e.V Gräfenhainichen (Ferropolis Mining and Adventure Railway)
 Ferropolis-Schule Gräfenhainichen Förderverein e.V. (Ferropolis School of Gräfenhainichen Development Club)
 Gräfenhainicher Carneval Club e.V. von 1973

References

External links
 Gräfenhainichen's homepage

 
Wittenberg (district)